"Ring Ring" is a song by English DJ Jax Jones and Mabel featuring Rich the Kid. It was released as a single on 22 June 2018, and was later included on Jones' EP Snacks. It reached number 12 on the UK Singles Chart and was certified Silver by the British Phonographic Industry in August 2018. It is the sixth single from Mabel's mixtape Ivy to Roses (2019), and was also included as a digital and streaming bonus track on Mabel's debut studio album, High Expectations.

Critical reception
Kat Bein of Billboard called the track a "summer song with dance-pop appeal and island rhythm", and said the track has "a certain richness to it, a sensual depth to counterbalance the catchy pop hook, a definite groove to get things heated as the sun goes down".

Music video
The music video opens with a mock commercial for the late-night hotline "0-800-RING-RING", and features Mabel as a worker at a call centre, as well as shots of Jax Jones and Mabel dancing in hallways with light displays behind them; Rich the Kid does not appear. Billboard compared its "vibes" to those of late 1990s and 2000s videos, calling it a "throwback", and acclaimed Jax Jones' and Mabel's outfits.

Charts

Certifications

References

2018 singles
2018 songs
Jax Jones songs
Mabel (singer) songs
Rich the Kid songs
Songs written by Jax Jones
Songs written by MNEK
Songs written by Kamille (musician)
Songs written by Marlon Roudette
Songs written by Mark Ralph (record producer)
Songs written by Mabel (singer)
Song recordings produced by Mark Ralph (record producer)
Song recordings produced by Jax Jones